The Abaris Golden Arrow was a planned homebuilt civil utility aircraft, intended to be manufactured in kit form. It was an unusually large aircraft for its type, able to seat six people (including the pilot) and, also unusually in a homebuilt plane, powered by a turboprop engine.

The Golden Arrow was intended to be of conventional monoplane configuration, with retractable tricycle undercarriage and a T-tail. It was largely of composite construction.

The craft derived its name from a legendary arrow, carried by the ancient Greek sage Abaris the Hyperborean.  The arrow, given to Abaris by the sun-god Apollo, conferred upon its bearer the power of flight.

In 2003, the first aircraft was not yet complete when the company closed down.

Specifications (estimated)

References

External links
 https://web.archive.org/web/20120204082212/http://www.abaris-aircraft.com/ Abaris Aircraft website

Low-wing aircraft
Single-engined tractor aircraft
Homebuilt aircraft
Abandoned civil aircraft projects of the United States
Golden Arrow